The 2013–14 Alabama A&M Bulldogs basketball team represented Alabama Agricultural and Mechanical University during the 2013–14 NCAA Division I men's basketball season. The Bulldogs, led by third year head coach Willie Hayes, played their home games at Elmore Gymnasium and were members of the Southwestern Athletic Conference. They finished the season 14–16, 10–8 in SWAC play to finish in fifth place. They advanced to the semifinals of the SWAC tournament where they lost to Prairie View A&M.

Roster

Schedule

|-
!colspan=9 style="background:#800000; color:#FFFFFF;"| Regular season

|-
!colspan=9 style="background:#800000; color:#FFFFFF;"| SWAC tournament

References

Alabama A&M Bulldogs basketball seasons
Alabama AandM